Malaysia participated in the 2009 Asian Martial Arts Games in Bangkok, Thailand from 1 to 8 August 2009.

Medallists

Sport in Malaysia
2009 in Malaysian sport